T. M. Kurtz House, also known as the Pennsylvania Memorial Home, is a historic home located at Punxsutawney, Jefferson County, Pennsylvania. It was built in 1904, and is a three-story, "L"-shaped brick dwelling in the Colonial Revival-style. It features a broad verandah and bow-front bay windows.  It was the home of Theodore M. Kurtz (1868-1945), prominent local businessman and member of the Pennsylvania State Senate.

It was added to the National Register of Historic Places in 1988.

References

Houses on the National Register of Historic Places in Pennsylvania
Colonial Revival architecture in Pennsylvania
Houses completed in 1904
Houses in Jefferson County, Pennsylvania
National Register of Historic Places in Jefferson County, Pennsylvania